is an evil Ultra Warrior that first appeared in the 2019 film Ultraman R/B The Movie and has made subsequent appearances in the Ultra Series. As established in Ultraman Taiga, Tregear was once a resident of the Land of Light and a friend of Ultraman Taro, but had since severed their connections after being disillusioned with the conflict surrounding between light and shadow.

In the English dub of Ultra Galaxy Fight, he is voiced by Michael Rhys.

Character conception
Ultraman Tregear was designed by artist Masayuki Gotou under the orders to make "an evil Ultraman like Belial". As no other details were given, Masayuki envisioned Tregear as a masked figure with multiple body restraints and a sealed Color Timer. As of Ultraman Taiga, this appearance is regarded as his sealed form to signify Tregear's departure from being an Ultraman. His pointed legs were modeled after the Ultraman B Type suit's shoes. For Tregear's fight against Ultraman Groob in the climax scene of Ultraman R/B The Movie, a CG animation model was made for the evil Ultra in order to interact with the entire CG appearance of the unified Ultra Warrior.

According to director Masayoshi Takesue, Ultraman Tregear was made to replace Belial as a recurring antagonist for the future Ultra Series. Scriptwriter Takao Nakano envisioned a pyramid hierarchy to compare Tregear's position as one whose capable of interacting with the human mind without showing his face. Tregear's mannerisms is based on the stereotypical gentleman antagonists in the James Bond film franchise. Takao acknowledged that Tregear's tendency to appear from LCD surfaces were akin to Alexis Kerib from SSSS.Gridman, but added that the script for the movie was already written long before the anime's release. In Ultraman Taiga, Tregear's established position as a major antagonist was written differently so as to make him as a contrast against past villains. His background as a former friend of Taro is a late addition exclusive to the series. As his human form Kirisaki, the black and white colored shirt he is wearing was designed by director Ryuichi Ichino as a nod to Tregear's distorted point of view towards light and darkness.

Naming
Ultraman Tregear was named by producer Yukinobu Tsuruta, based on the Greek words for "mad curiosity" (tréla periérgeia). The latter is similarly translated into Tregear's name by the Land of Light citizens in his title novel.

History

Past
As chronicled in his title novel , Tregear was an introverted young Ultra with fascination for forbidden knowledges. After accepting Taro's offer of friendship, the two became close friends and frequently went on interstellar travels to various alien planets. As an adult, Tregear took the opportunity to work as a scientist under Ultraman Hikari's supervision while Taro was fighting on Earth during his title series' run, creating the Taiga Spark that would be used by future members of the Tri-Squad. As a result of reading Ultraman Belial's past and his supervisor Hikari embarking on a vendetta against Bogarl, Tregear became disillusioned with the conflict surrounding the light and darkness and went on a self-imposed exile to outer space. With his new abilities, Tregear brought disasters to other dimensions for his personal enjoyment. Upon these deeds include granting Murnau her crystallization powers, corrupting Leugocyte into a monster and briefly encountered Greeza along the way.

Ultraman R/B The Movie
In order to force Riku Asakura down the path of villainy like Belial, Tregear spirited away the youth and his alien friend Pega into the world of Ultraman R/B and placed the latter into Gan-Q as a hostage crisis situation for Ultraman Geed. The intention was to trick the young man into killing his long time friend. Later on, he targeted the heartbroken Katsumi Minato by transforming his friend Yukio into Snake Darkness and tricked him into banishing himself to the Hoster 21 System to remove any Ultraman opposition on Earth after using Mecha Gomora's attack on Pigmons as a bait. When Katsumi was finally rescued by his family members, Tregear was forced to support Snake Darkness and even corrupted it when Yukio shows sign of regaining his old self. He was seemingly killed by Ultraman Groob, but Tregear revived himself not long after and left the Earth.

Ultra Galaxy Fight: New Generation Heroes and Ultraman Taiga

In Ultra Galaxy Fight: New Generation Heroes, Tregear masterminded the activities made by the League of Darkness as their benefactor and suggested Dark-Killer to kidnap Grigio on Earth to prevent the formation of Groob. He was forced to fight against Ultraman Ribut and left a pair of Red Kings once empowering Dark-Killer and Zero Darkness. His attempt to invade the Land of Light was held back by the New Generation Heroes joined by Taro and the Tri-Squad in a dogfight that lead to the latter trio's seeming deaths.

Fast forward to 12 years later in Ultraman Taiga, Tregear fought against the Tri-Squad members on Planet Earth after their bonds with Hiroyuki Kudo on numerous occasions. He took on the human form  to torment the lives of humans and aliens alike for his twisted enjoyment. This led to Taiga obtaining Tri-Strium as a form that could keep up with Tregear's enormous strength. In a desperate bid, Tregear was forced to summon Woola into devouring Earth. His attempt to sabotage Taiga and EGIS' operation backfired when his energy beam was used as a catalyst to feed Woola and ended the monster's life in a painless way. After rejecting a chance of redemption, Tregear allowed himself to be seemingly obliterated by Taiga Tri-Strium's Quattro Squad Blaster.

Six months later in Ultraman Taiga The Movie, his previous defeat from Tri-Strium resulted with an accidental release of a fragment of Grimdo. The rest of Grimdo remained sealed within Tregear's body and the fallen Ultra used said monster to possess Taro on Earth, creating a conflict between both father and son in the midst of the New Generation Heroes' appearances. Taiga Tri-Strium successfully saved Taro by performing Ultra Dynamite, but Tregear allows himself to be consumed for Grimdo to restore its full power. After the ancient god's defeat by Reiga, Tregear was last seen whispering Taro's name as he disappeared.

Parallel Isotope
Tregear's original form, appears in Ultra Galaxy Fight: The Absolute Conspiracy and The Destined Crossroad as one of Absolute Tartarus' Parallel Isotopes.

Tartarus traveled back into time when Tregear became disillusioned over Hikari's fall as Hunter Knight Tsurugi and budding fear over the conflicting light and darkness, showing him visions of his future. Tregear takes off Tartarus to take a new path and becomes a Parallel Isotope, a time variant of the prime version Tregear whose timeline is maintain. Tregear appears in present sometime after the original Tregear's death alongside Belial, the two fighting the present-day Ultra Brothers and the Ultra League to ensure the success of Yullian's kidnapping. After failing to prevent Yullian's rescue and dispirited from Taiga's plea to stop their fight on Planet Blizzard, Tregear was given the Tregear Eye by Belial when the latter choose to desert his employers, leaving the former's decision being ambiguous.

Minor appearances
Ultraman New Generation Chronicle (2019): Tregear appears in the 13th episode by intruding the Booska Theater which Booska and Pega hosted. His attempt to coerce the two into rooting for the New Generation Heroes' adversaries failed as they remember how the Ultras overcome their hardships.

Profile
Height: 50 m
Weight: 37,000 t
Flight Speed: Mach 9.9
Birthplace: Nebula M78, Land of Light
Year Debut: 2019
First Appearance: Ultraman R/B The Movie (2019)

Transformation
Kirisaki does so by pressing the top button of the item to unveil a mask-like form and align it to his face. Upon pressing the front button on the central hilt, a dark blue vortex surround Kirisaki and Tregear's figure is unveiled in his place.

Powers and abilities
Since Tregear is a  member of the Ultra race in the Land of Light, he originally displays weaker stamina and beam attacks, hence he was not appropriate for combat. However, he is knowledgeable in the field of science and co-developed the Taiga Spark with Taro's help. In The Absolute Conspiracy, Tregear's Early Style form was given an empowerment of Tartarus' Absolutian powers to compensate his lack of fighting capabilities. This allows him to fight on equal terms with Ultraman Zero and fires his finishing move .

After forming a pact with Grimdo, Tregear's body is partially wrapped with restraints and a cover on his Color Timer to keep the monster's seal intact. Grimdo's powers allow Tregear to endlessly operate without limitations and creating  space portals to multiple dimensions. Aside from the finishing move  and corruption-inducing beam , he can cheat death from fatal attacks by having an alternate universe counterpart replacing his original body.

Reception
In an Animate Times interview with the voice actor Yuma Uchida, he mentioned to have grow up watching Ultraman Tiga and Ultraman Dyna as a child. In terms of the evil Ultra, Yuma viewed him as a darker contrast to what could have been a lighter and softer family tone established in Ultraman R/B. During his first recording of Ultraman R/B The Movie, Yuma was well aware of his character's alignment as a villain, but was ordered to give his voice portrayal as an opposite of villainy. His most memorable scene was when Tregear approaching Katsumi Minato during the young man's internal crisis by appearing as a morally ambiguous but helpful figure. In his words, Yuma believed that Tregear is a menacing figure in appearance if compared to others such as Rosso, Blu and Geed, but wished that the viewers would view that all Ultras are equally great in designs.

During the filming of Ultraman Taiga, Yuma admitted that he did not interacted with Kou Nanase, Kirisaki's actor, as they worked in different sets despite their roles in portraying the same person. In The Absolute Conspiracy, he stated that Tregear's voice portrayal in Early Style was to indicate the character before his fall as an Ultra who still had his admiration for Taro.

Merchandises
Ultraman Tregear was announced to be sold as a pre-order exclusive articulated S.H. Figuarts action figure. It is slated to be released in June 2020 and consist of replacement hands, Trera Ultigeyser firing effect and Strium Blaster firing effect for the already released Ultraman Taiga figure of the same line.

Kirisaki's actor, Kou Nanase designed a brand of T-shirts consist of a white lotus and Tregear's stylized quote "I came here to fulfill your wishes" as part of a marketing campaign for Ultraman Taiga The Movie. However, due to the movie's initial suspension from the COVID-19 pandemic in Japan, the T-shirt was sold as a pre-order exclusive item for members of Tsuburaya Membership Club

References

Sources

External links
Ultraman Tregear in Tsuburaya Productions' English Website

Tregear
Extraterrestrial supervillains
Fictional characters with immortality
Fictional characters with superhuman strength
Fictional defectors
Fictional giants
Fictional mass murderers
Fictional scientists
Male characters in film
Male characters in television
Television characters introduced in 2019
Television supervillains